Brett Leason (born April 30, 1999) is a Canadian ice hockey winger with the Anaheim Ducks of the National Hockey League (NHL). He was selected 56th overall by the Capitals in the 2019 NHL Entry Draft after going undrafted the previous two years. On July 11, 2019, Leason signed a three-year, entry-level contract with the Washington Capitals.

Playing career
Leason made his NHL debut for the Washington Capitals on October 29, 2021, against the Arizona Coyotes. Three days later, he scored his first NHL goal against the Tampa Bay Lightning. 

On October 10, 2022, Leason was claimed off waivers by the Anaheim Ducks.

Career statistics

Regular season and playoffs

International

Awards and honors

References

External links
 

1999 births
Living people
Anaheim Ducks players
Calgary Canucks players
Canadian ice hockey right wingers
Hershey Bears players
Prince Albert Raiders players
Ice hockey people from Calgary
Tri-City Americans players
Washington Capitals draft picks
Washington Capitals players